Marmorofusus vercoi is a species of sea snail, a marine gastropod mollusc in the family Fasciolariidae, the spindle snails, the tulip snails and their allies.

Description

Distribution
This marine species is endemic to Australia and occurs off Western Australia, from vicinity of Albany to Freemantle, 10–45 m

References

External links
 Snyder M.A. 2004. Two new Fusinus (Mollusca : Gastropoda : Fasciolariidae) from Western Australia. Molluscan Research 24(2): 123-130
 Lyons W.G. & Snyder M.A. (2019). Reassignments to the genus Marmorofusus Snyder & Lyons, 2014 (Neogastropoda: Fasciolariidae: Fusininae) of species from the Red Sea, Indian Ocean, and southwestern Australia. Zootaxa. 4714(1): 1-64.

vercoi
Gastropods described in 2004